Voilà is the first album of the Brazilian singer Rhaissa Bittar, who arose from the alternative music scene of São Paulo (Brazil). It was released in 2010.

Album
The Voilà album, Rhaissa Bittar's first work, stands out especially due to the theatrical tone of its lyrics and the arrangements of the songs. The album mixes a variety of musical genres such as Choro, Tango, Samba, Folk, Jazz, Pop and Rock.

The songs are like chronicles, small stories of our day-to-days that come to life in Rhaissa's voice. One story is about a posh girl that had a chunk of her cuticle pulled when getting her nails done ("Chilique Chique"). Another song talks about a girl in love that had to bring along her little sibling on a date ("Piquenique no Horto"). There is also a story of a carrier pigeon who got tired of carrying messages from traffickers in a prison, and wants to retire at See Square ("Pombo Correto").

Voilà was recorded at the Panela Produtora studios in 2009 with the musical direction of Daniel Galli. The album has notable cameo appearances such as the clarinetist Nailor Proveta from (Banda Mantiqueira), the violinist Ricardo Herz, accordionist Lulinha Alencar and drummer Pedro Ito. Another special guest is the singer and songwriter Mauricio Pereira on the track "Boneca de Palha".

Curiosities

Pa Ri
At the first audition, the tango song "Pa Ri" can make the listener believe that Rhaissa Bittar is singing in French. But when people read the lyrics carefully, it unveils a trick with Portuguese words, which Rhaissa sings with French accent.

An answer to Ary Barroso
The song "Boneca de Palha" is inspired by the "Boneca de Piche" of the traditional Brazilian composer Ary Barroso - sung by Carmen Miranda and also the author in the 1930s. The first verses of music by Daniel Galli, played by Rhaissa Bittar and Mauricio Pereira, quotes the author of "Boneca de Piche".

Pombo Correto (Pigeons)
The song "Pombo Correto" was inspired by a newspaper report that said that pigeons were being used by inmates to bring cellular chip inside the prison in Sorocaba.

Before joining the album Voilà, this song was part of the Disco em um dia. Disco em Um Dia (The In-a-day Album) is a project developed by Panela Produtora in which the challenge is to record, compose, produce and mix an album in 24 hours. To prove that the songs were actually written on the day of the recording, all lyrics are based on the day's newspaper articles. Rhaissa Bittar participated in its third edition, singing the song "O Violino e o Viaduto", inspired on a photo by Hélvio Romero published on the Estado de S. Paulo newspaper.

Mandarin songs
The album Voilà has two songs in Mandarin Chinese composed by Rhaissa herself. "Chapéu" tells the story of a woman that loves hats; "Folk Chinês" talks about a better world. Rhaissa Bittar speaks fluent Mandarin for having lived a year in Taiwan as an exchange student in 2007.

Hidden track
During the interview on Programa do Jô, Rhaissa revealed that Voilà has a hidden track. The secret song can only be listened on some CD players, never on a computer. This track number is numbered "-1", because is necessary to press and hold the review button at the beginning of the album.

Soap opera soundtrack
Between the years of 2012 and 2013, the "Pif Paf" song was part of the soundtrack of the Brazilian soap opera Balacobaco produced by Rede Record. The song was the theme of the characters Marlene (Antonia Fontenelle) and Aragon (Umberto Magnani), besides opening and other characters - Violet Osório, played by Simone Spoladore; and Cremilda Osorio played by Solange Couto) - in some chapters.

Music box
The music box that is played at the end of the album was built by the producer Daniel Galli with the notes of his composition "Relógio".

The show
The Voilà album concerts traveled the stages of Sesc, Áuditório Ibirapuera, Virada Cultural SP, Casa de Francisca, entre outros de São Paulo, Bahia, Paraná, and mainly in Pernambuco - state in which Voilà was played in Rec Beat, Espaço Cultural Santander, Espaço Muda and Muda FIG.

Tracks
 -1. Hidden Track (Diego Guimarães/ Rhaissa Bittar/ Daniel Galli)
 "Voilà" (Daniel Galli)
 "Pa Ri" (Daniel Galli)
 "Pif Paf" (Daniel Galli)
 "Dig Dom" (Filipe Trielli)
 "Caos" (Rhaissa Bittar / Daniel Galli)
 "Folk Chinês" (Rhaissa Bittar / Daniel Galli)
 "Chapéu" (Rhaissa Bittar / Daniel Galli)
 "Chilique Chique" (Daniel Galli)
 "Boneca de Palha" (Daniel Galli)
 "Pombo Correto" (Daniel Galli)
 "Piquenique no Horto" (Mauricio Pereira/ Filipe Trielli/ Daniel Galli)
 "Entre Outras Coisas" (Daniel Galli)
 "Relógio" (Daniel Galli)

References

2010 albums